The IKEA Museum is a museum located in Älmhult, Sweden, that opened to the public on June 30, 2016. It presents the history of the Swedish furnishing company IKEA. It replaced IKEA Through the Ages (located in the Corporate Culture Center 'Tillsammans'), a smaller 800 m2 exhibition that showed 20 different room settings with IKEA furniture and objects.

The IKEA Museum is in the same building where the first IKEA store opened in 1958. The store moved to a new location in Älmhult in 2012. At this time, work began on converting the store into a museum, with an original planned opening date of 2015. The facade of the building was restored to recreate its original appearance. The museum has an area of 3500 m2.

References

External links

 

IKEA
Industry museums in Sweden
Museums in Kronoberg County
Furniture museums
Museums established in 2016
2016 establishments in Sweden